Woodstock is a bounded semi-rural locality in Victoria, Australia, located just north of Melbourne's outer suburbs, located within the City of Whittlesea local government area.

Australian contemporary poet Robbie Coburn hails from Woodstock. Former Western Australian premier Philip Collier was born and raised in Woodstock. Writer/ Director Billy Rowlands is also from Woodstock.

History

Woodstock Post Office opened on 9 January 1858 and closed in 1971. To the west Woodstock West Post office opened in 1877 and continued operating until 1959. In September 1876 a small timber Catholic church, known as the church of St. Patrick, was erected for local worshippers.

Deputations were made to the Victorian government during the 1890s to bring a railway line through the area.

Books on Woodstock 
Jones, Michael Nature's Plenty: a history of the City of Whittlesea, Sydney, N.S.W. Allen & Unwin, 1992

References

External links
 Refer to Woodstock in Victoria History and People Facebook page for further information

Towns in Victoria (Australia)
City of Whittlesea